KAM Isaiah Israel is a Reform synagogue located at 1100 E. Hyde Park Boulevard in the historic Kenwood neighborhood in Chicago, Illinois. It is the oldest Jewish congregation in Chicago, with its oldest core founded in 1847 as Kehilath Anshe Ma'arav ("Congregation of the Men of the West"; Hebrew: קהלת אנשי מערב).

History

The congregation Kehilath Anshe Ma'arav ("Congregation of the Men of the West") was founded on November 3, 1847, at the wholesale dry-goods store of Levi Rosenfeld and Jacob Rosenberg located at 155 East Lake Street by twenty men, many of whom hailed from Bavaria. At the time, this section of the Chicago Loop was the center of the small Chicago Jewish community. The newly founded congregation was first housed above Rosenfeld and Rosenberg's store at Lake and Wells street. After increasing membership and lack of space, the congregation was soon forced to find a more suitable space to accommodate their growing community. A lot was leased at Clark and Quincy streets (now the site of the Kluczynski Federal Building), and construction of a small frame synagogue began. After an investment of $12,000, the one and a half story building, with a capacity of 450 people, was dedicated on June 13, 1851. After only two years, their land lease had expired, forcing the congregation to move the new building to Adams and Wells in 1853. Unscathed by the Great Chicago Fire of 1871, KAM's synagogue building was burned down in the Chicago Fire of 1874.

In 1890, KAM moved into its Louis Sullivan and Dankmar Adler designed temple in Bronzeville, and in 1924 moved again to a private residence in Hyde Park. The former synagogue became the Pilgrim Baptist Church, the birthplace of Gospel music. It was placed on the National Register of Historic Places in 1973, designated a Chicago Landmark in 1981, and partially destroyed by fire in 2006. In 1971, KAM merged with another Reform congregation, Isaiah Israel (builders of the present synagogue), to become KAM Isaiah Israel.

The synagogue is situated in the Kenwood neighborhood of Chicago, an area known for its large homes and well-to-do residents, such as Barack Obama (who lives across from the synagogue on Greenwood Avenue) and Muhammad Ali. The temple's architecture was inspired by those constructed during the Byzantine Period of Judaism. The minaret is not on top of the dome as it appears in this photo, but rather it is atop a tower that functions as a chimney, behind the building. Built for the Isaiah Israel congregation in 1924, the structure was designed by Alfred S. Alschuler, who drew his influence from photographs of the second-century Severus synagogue unearthed at Tiberias, in Galilee.  The extensions were designed by architects John Alschuler (the son of Alfred) and Ron Dirsmith. The building was designated an official Chicago Landmark on June 9, 1977.

Notable clergy
 Solomon Freehof, rabbi from 1924–1934
 Arnold Jacob Wolf, rabbi from 1980–2000

Notable members

See also
 Synagogues built in the Neo-Byzantine style:
 Hurva Synagogue, Jerusalem, Israel
 Grand Choral Synagogue, Saint Petersburg, Russia
 Congregation Beth Israel, West Hartford, Connecticut
 History of the Jews in Chicago
 List of Chicago Landmarks
 Pilgrim Baptist Church

References

External links
 Official Website

German-American culture in Chicago
German-Jewish culture in the United States
Synagogues in Chicago
Chicago Landmarks
Religious organizations established in 1847
Byzantine Revival synagogues
Synagogues completed in 1924
Synagogue buildings with domes
Reform synagogues in Illinois
1847 establishments in Illinois
Synagogues on the National Register of Historic Places in Illinois
Hyde Park, Chicago